= IDeA Networks of Biomedical Research Excellence =

NCRR's IDeA Networks of Biomedical Research Excellence (INBRE) promote the development, coordination, and sharing of research resources and expertise that will expand the research opportunities and increase the number of competitive investigators in the IDeA-eligible states.

The IDeA Networks were initially supported by NCRR's Division of Research Infrastructure (DRI). When the National Center for Advancing Translational Research (NCATS) was established in 2011, the NIH was required to close one of its Centers or Institutes so as to stay within the limit of 27 Centers and Institutes, as required by Congress. Oversight of the IDeA Networks component of NCRR was transferred to the National Institute of General Medical Sciences (NIGMS). INBRE are intended to enhance the caliber of scientific faculty at research institutions and undergraduate schools, thereby attracting more promising students to these organizations and to improving the biomedical workforce of the state in which the INBRE is located. The IDeA Networks also support Centers of Biomedical Research Excellence (COBRE) in IDeA states.
